Marc Basseng (born 12 December 1978 in Engelskirchen) is a German racing driver.

Career
Basseng began his career in karting. In 1997 he began competing in the Porsche Carrera Cup Germany for the UPS Porsche Junior Team, finishing third in the 1998 standings. He raced in the Renault Sport Clio Trophy in 2001 and 2002 and won the German Clio Cup in 2003.

In 2004, Basseng began to compete in the VLN Nürburgring Endurance Championship, where he has claimed 25 overall wins. The driver also competed part-time at the FIA GT3 European Championship, FIA GT Championship, Le Mans Series, American Le Mans Series and ADAC GT Masters. In 2008, the Belgian raced full-time at the American Le Mans Series in a Porsche 911 for Farnbacher Loles and VICI Racing.

He began racing in the new FIA GT1 World Championship in 2010 for the All-Inkl.com Münnich Motorsport team, for which he also serves as team manager.
On 26 July 2010, Marc Basseng achieved the lap record in a Pagani Zonda R on the Nürburgring Nordschleife. In 2011 he finished 5th in the standings for Münnich, sharing his ride with Markus Winkelhock. In 2012 he claimed the world championship with Winkelhock, managing to win a race and finishing 10 times in the podium.

Basseng moved with Münnich Motorsport to the World Touring Car Championship for 2013. As he was the reigning FIA GT1 World Champion he was ruled to be ineligible for the Yokohama Independents' Trophy. He qualified eighth for the season opening Race of Italy and was battling for sixth place in race one with Gabriele Tarquini before dropping out of contention when he served a drive–through penalty for not having all his wheels down on the ground at the three-minute warning on the grid. He started second for race two but dropped down to fourth before challenging Tarquini for third on the last lap.

Racing record

Complete GT1 World Championship results

Complete World Touring Car Championship results
(key) (Races in bold indicate pole position) (Races in italics indicate fastest lap)

Complete Blancpain Sprint Series results

* Season still in progress.

Complete IMSA SportsCar Championship results
(key) (Races in bold indicate pole position; results in italics indicate fastest lap)

† Basseng did not complete sufficient laps in order to score full points.

References

External links
Official website 

Living people
1978 births
People from Oberbergischer Kreis
Sportspeople from Cologne (region)
Racing drivers from North Rhine-Westphalia
German racing drivers
FIA GT Championship drivers
American Le Mans Series drivers
European Le Mans Series drivers
FIA GT1 World Championship drivers
Porsche Supercup drivers
24 Hours of Daytona drivers
Rolex Sports Car Series drivers
World Touring Car Championship drivers
Blancpain Endurance Series drivers
ADAC GT Masters drivers
WeatherTech SportsCar Championship drivers
24 Hours of Spa drivers
European Rallycross Championship drivers
24H Series drivers
Rowe Racing drivers
Nürburgring 24 Hours drivers
Phoenix Racing drivers
ISR Racing drivers
Team Joest drivers
W Racing Team drivers
Saintéloc Racing drivers
Le Mans Cup drivers
GT4 European Series drivers
Porsche Carrera Cup Germany drivers
Hyundai Motorsport drivers